John H. Mitchell (November 5, 1899 – April 20, 1992) was an American lawyer and politician.

Born in Fort Dodge, Iowa, Mitchell went to parochial and public schools in Fort Dodge. He then went to Loras College and served in the Student Army Training Corps. Mitchell switched to University of Iowa and graduated there. He was admitted to the Iowa bar in 1923. Mitchell practiced law in Humboldt, Iowa. He served on the Webster County School Board and on the Fort Dodge Community School Board. From 1933 to 1937, Mitchell served in the Iowa House of Representatives and served as speaker of the Iowa House of Representatives. Mitchell was a Democrat. He then served as Iowa Attorney General from 1936 to 1939. Mitchell moved back to Fort Dodge and continued to practiced law. Mitchell died in a hospital in Fort Dodge, Iowa from cancer.

Notes

1899 births
1992 deaths
Politicians from Fort Dodge, Iowa
People from Humboldt, Iowa
Loras College alumni
University of Iowa alumni
Iowa lawyers
Military personnel from Iowa
School board members in Iowa
Speakers of the Iowa House of Representatives
Democratic Party members of the Iowa House of Representatives
Iowa Attorneys General
20th-century American politicians
20th-century American lawyers